Nemaclinus atelestos, the Threadfin blenny, is a species of labrisomid blenny known from the western Atlantic Ocean.  This species is the only known member of its genus.

References

Labrisomidae
Monotypic fish genera
Fish described in 1907
Taxa named by Victor G. Springer
Taxa named by James Erwin Böhlke